= Beth K. Smith =

American activist (1921–2017)

Beth K. Smith (1921-2017) was a civil rights and social justice advocate. She co-founded the Women's Employment Network in Kansas City, Missouri.

== Life ==
Beth K. Smith was born into a Jewish family in Omaha, Nebraska on February 11, 1921. She graduated from Wellesley College in 1943. During World War II, she worked in an airplane factory to help with the war effort.
